UNICA may refer to:
 Network of Universities from the Capitals of Europe
 University of Ciego de Ávila, a university in Ciego de Ávila, Cuba
 UNICA, Brazil, an association of producers of sugarcane and ethanol fuel in Brazil
 University of Cagliari (Università degli Studi di Cagliari), a state university in Cagliari, Sardinia, Italy

See also
Unica (disambiguation)